Chana Jor Garam is a common street snack in most  Indian states. It is usually made from chickpeas that are roasted and spiced. The chickpeas are soaked, dried, fried and then later flattened into mini discs. The main ingredients are freshly chopped tomatoes, onion, few spices and a green chutney.  It has  a zesty and tart flavor. It is eaten with  onion, lemon, tomato and green chilies. It is enjoyed both as a snack or as a crunchy addition to side dishes.

Names 
Chana Jor Garam is a common name in different states of India. In some states it is also spelled as Chana Zor Garam or Chana Chor Garam. 

Bollywood has also popularized the snack mentioning the snack in songs from films like  Bandhan (1939),Naya Andaz (1956) and Kranti (1981).

See also 
Pani puri
Bhel puri

References 

Street food in India
Indian snack foods